The Bahrain Telecommunications Regulatory Authority (TRA) is a governmental institution which regularly updates and publishes reports on the country's national numbering plan. The reports include all the number blocks used in the Kingdom of Bahrain.

Telephone numbers in Bahrain are generally eight digits long with the exception of short codes which have fewer digits. Majority of the fixed land line numbers start with 1. Cellular (Mobile) phone numbers and pager numbers start with 3* or 663* or 669* depending on the service provider.

There is no area code in Bahrain, however the two digit numbers after the land line prefixes represent different cities or regions in Bahrain.

Batelco is the main service provider for land lines. Mobile users commonly subscribe to Batelco, Zain or STC.

See also
 Telecommunications in Bahrain
Bahrain Mobile Number Database

References

Bahrain
Bahrain communications-related lists